East Brooklyn is the name of the following places in the United States.

East Brooklyn, Connecticut
East Brooklyn, Illinois